Hare Trimmed is a 1953 Warner Bros. Merrie Melodies short directed by Friz Freleng and written by Warren Foster.  The short was released on June 20, 1953, and features Bugs Bunny, Yosemite Sam and Granny.

Plot
The story opens in a town with a sign saying it is called Doughnut Center with a caption below that reads "What A Hole" and Sam reading a newspaper indicating that a local widow has just inherited . Sam plots to marry the widow to take the money: once he has it, he will take everything else, house and all, from the widow, close the orphanage, and get rid of the police department, but Bugs overhears him and plots to foil the plan by posing as a rival French suitor. The widow, Granny, is excited to have two suitors, but Sam is not. Challenging Bugs by throwing down a gauntlet, he slaps him with a glove; Bugs slaps him with a brick-filled glove. Bugs then challenges Sam to a shooting round at ten paces. Sam accepts and they go out into the front yard to do it. With Sam the only one who has a pistol, Bugs times the steps. However, after counting out the ninth step, instead of counting out the tenth one, he says the halves and quarters of nine, and then the numbers and their halves and quarters that come after ten. Sam absentmindedly follows them, walking out into the street, and when Bugs does count out the tenth step, Sam turns to fire...and is run over by a bus, with Bugs pleased that it was on schedule, so he could have it run Sam over when it did. Bugs then poses as the widow, teasing him and pushing a piano down the stairs over him. The real widow arrives and offers the dazed Sam a cup of black coffee. While Sam is waiting for his coffee, Bugs returns disguised again and asks whether Sam wants one lump or two (of sugar). Sam replies two and receives two blows from a mallet.

Bugs runs off before the real widow returns with Sam's coffee, and Sam violently kicks the cup with rage after she asks the same question, causing her to gasp in fear: "He's flipped his lid!" The widow hides in an upstairs room. Sam then realizes what he has just done and tries to apologize to her, but to no avail: she shoots Sam when he peeps through the keyhole, and again when he tries to enter via the transom. Outside the room, Bugs (still disguised) whistles at him. Again thinking Bugs to be the widow, Sam apologizes and accepts the two lumps, receiving two more mallet blows and claiming he likes them. After Bugs suggests they elope, he begins throwing things he wants them to take with down to Sam via the second story window. Bugs throws so many things down to Sam that he says, "That dame's takin' everything but the kitchen sink!" which is then promptly thrown down to him as well, much to his surprised disbelief. The last to go is the safe, dazing Sam when it is dropped on his head with so much force, he ends up inside the safe, after which Bugs opens the safe door, and they go to get married.

At the church, Bugs' gown bottom catches on a floor nail and is ripped off, revealing Bugs' cotton tail, and when Sam sees it, he refuses to marry Bugs, running off. Bugs mock cries: "Boo-hoo-hoo! Always a bridesmaid but never a bride. Boo-hoo-hoo-hoo!"

See also
 List of Bugs Bunny cartoons
 List of Yosemite Sam cartoons

References

External links
 
 

1950s Warner Bros. animated short films
1953 animated films
1953 films
1953 short films
Bugs Bunny films
Yosemite Sam films
Merrie Melodies short films
Short films directed by Friz Freleng
1950s English-language films
Films about inheritances
Films about widowhood